Creation Theatre Company is a producing theatre based in Oxford, England. Founded in 1996 by David Parrish the company became a charity in 2007 and produces site-specific adaptations of classic stories and Shakespeare.

Management
The founding Artistic Director David Parrish announced his departure in 2010, to take on a producing role at the National Theatre of Norway. He was succeeded by James Erskine, who had previously worked for The Gate Theatre and Shakespeare's Globe. Erskine left the company in 2012 and since 2012 Lucy Askew has been Artistic Producer of Creation Theatre.

Cast and creative team
Creation does not have a fixed company of actors or artistic staff, instead using a freelance team for each project. Past Directors include Laurie Sansom, Joanna Read, Richard Beecham, Gareth Machin, Tim Carroll, Natalie Abrahami, Jonathan Holloway and Charlotte Conquest.

Performance venues
Creation has never had a theatre building and produces shows in unusual spaces across the city of Oxford and beyond. The first productions, from 1996 to 2002 were performed open air in the grounds of Magdalen College School. For Christmas performances between 2004 and 2011 the company erected a Spiegeltent in the car park of BMW Group Plant with shows such as Beauty and the Beast and The Winter's Tale. Following its renovation in 2005 Creation has performed seven shows at Oxford Castle. In 2011, Creation was the first theatre company to perform at Blackwell's Bookshop to perform Doctor Faustus, and has gone on to perform Hamlet and The Odyssey, a co-production with The Factory Theatre Company, and Dr Jekyll & Mr Hyde. Since Christmas 2011 Creation has performed at The North Wall Arts Centre with A Christmas Carol, Aladdin and the Magical Lamp, The Lion, the Witch and the Wardrobe and The Wind in the Willows. Most recently, Creation has staged festive productions of Alice and Cinderella at The Mill Arts Centre, George Orwell's Nineteen Eighty-Four at the Oxford Mathematical Institute and an adventurous production of A Midsummer Night's Dream with scenes set across the Oxford City Centre. In 2019 Creation put on Dracula at the London Library. In 2020 Creation performed live performances online via Zoom including, The Tempest, The Time Machine | A Virtual Reality (an adaptation of The Time Machine) and Alice | A Virtual Theme Park (an adaptation of Alice's Adventures in Wonderland).

Pascale Aebischer and Rachael Nicholas, University of Exeter, released The Digital Theatre Transformation Report - A Case study & a Digital Toolkit in October 2020.  The case study is based on Creation's digital production, The Tempest Live, Interactive and In Your Living Room, one of the first productions made for the digital stage utilising Zoom at the beginning of April 2020.  The report is aimed at performers and companies embarking on transforming their physical theatre practice into a digital mode of home working for both office staff and creative practitioners.

List of Creation productions

Critical reception

References

1996 establishments in England
Organizations established in 1996
Organisations based in Oxford
Theatre companies in England
Theatre in Oxford